Agua Bendita is a 2010 Philippine romantic fantasy religious-drama television series based on the Liwayway Komiks comic book series of the same name created by Rod Santiago and directed by Malu L. Sevilla, Claudio "Tots" Sanchez-Mariscal IV, Don M. Cuaresma and Jojo A. Saguin. The series stars Andi Eigenmann in her dual role as twin sisters Agua and Bendita Cristi, together with leading men Matteo Guidicelli and Jason Abalos, with an ensemble cast consisting of Vina Morales, John Estrada, Pilar Pilapil, Alessandra De Rossi, Dimples Romana, Carlos Agassi, Pen Medina, Malou Crisologo, Jason Gainza, Malou de Guzman, Bing Loyzaga, Zaijian Jaranilla, and Zoren Legaspi in their supporting roles. The series premiered on ABS-CBN's Primetime Bida nighttime block from February 8 to September 3, 2010 replacing May Bukas Pa and was replaced by 1DOL.

Series overview

Plot
Desperate to save his wife from having a miscarriage, Marcial steals Father Guido’s agua bendita, which is intended to cure Criselda. He manages to save his wife and their babies, but one of their daughters is born with unexplainable physical defect.

Cast and characters

Main cast
 Andi Eigenmann / Xyriel Manabat (young)
As Agua Cristi - Agua was born with an unexplainable physical defect: she can heal people with tears in grief.
As Bendita Cristi - The Bida Kontrabida. Bendita is the physically normal but insecure twin, who feels that her parents concentrate of Agua as a result of her disability, leaving little for Bendita. She struggles with her jealousy but in the end learns to be humble and to love her twin sister.
 Matteo Guidicelli / Bugoy Cariño (young) as Ronnie Aguirre - Ronnie met Agua when they were children, but when they met as young adults he was blind; without knowing Agua's real identity, Ronnie learned to love her for her personality. His mother was a maid from a rich Italian family who got impregnated by the owner's son. To cover the shame, Ronnie's father left them penniless with only a house. He is Agua's love interest, favoring her more than Bendita, due to the former's kind and naive nature.
 Jason Abalos / Maliksi Morales (young) as Paculdo "Paco" Barrameda - Paco the poor son of Criselda and Baldo, often called "Tod" when he was young. He met the twins when he saved their lives on separate occasions. Tasked by his mother to bring her Agua in order to be freed from her disorder, he often works different jobs which would lead him to the Cristi's during which he begins to pity Agua. He later becomes Bendita's love interest after being completely rejected by Ronnie.

Supporting cast
 Vina Morales as Mercedes Montenegro-Cristi - Agua and Bendita's mother, who caused Agua's disability by drinking holy water when she was pregnant.
 John Estrada as Dr. Marcial Cristi - Mercedes' husband. A doctor.
 Pilar Pilapil as Doña Amalia "Wowa" Montenegro - Mercedes' mother. She is very close to Bendita, but not to Agua whom she regards as a 'freak', but do loved her and care for her, as she was protecting her from the danger. She is pretend to root of Agua's problems and Bendita's ill temper. 
 Alessandra De Rossi as Divina Caguiat Montenegro - Doña Amalia's niece. She had feelings towards Marcial and Doña Amalia conspired to fulfill the Doña's goal of breaking Marcial's family bond.
 Dimples Romana as Criselda Barrameda - Padre Guido's niece who was the intended recipient of the miraculous agua bendita. She is Paco's mother and has epilepsy, which the agua bendita was supposed to cure. Later Doña Amalia and Criselda set a wicked plan in which they will kidnap Agua and kill her.
 Carlos Agassi as Baldomero "Baldo" Barrameda - Criselda's husband who is a gambler and a drunk.
 Pen Medina as Padre Guido - The original owner of agua bendita and Criselda's uncle. He asked Marcial to give the agua bendita to Criselda to cure her illness. Unfortunately, Marcial stole it for Mercedes. Padre Guido appears from time to time in Agua's dreams to help her use her abilities she has gained from the agua bendita for good, though he also appears in Bendita's dreams, where he tells her that she can't use Agua's abilities because she does not deserve such privileges, and instead make her understand the error of her ways.
 Malou Crisologo as Tonyang/Muchacha - Agua's nanny. She and Marcial are the only two people who knew about Agua's disability when she was born.
 Jayson Gainza as Ben Ramirez - A fisherman who saved Agua from danger and raised her.
 Malou de Guzman as Rosie Ramirez - Ben's wife who helped Agua from danger and raised her.
 Bing Loyzaga as Solita Aguirre - Ronnie's mother. She was once a maid on a rich Italian family. She got impregnated by one of the owner's sons.
 Zaijian Jaranilla as Otep (voice) - Agua's fish (clownfish) friend.
 Zoren Legaspi as Luisito "Lui" Mondigo - Lisa's son who used to court Mercedes. However, due to Mercedes' rebellion, she ended up marrying Marcial. When Mercedes and her family decided to migrate in America, he found a chance to caress Mercedes once again.

Guest cast
 Neil Ryan Sese as Señor Lucas - A fake healer who helped Criselda when they needed some money. Criselda acts as if she is being healed by Lucas to attract customers.
 Lollie Mara as Doña Caridad Montenegro - Amalia's sister. She is Divina's cruel stepmother.
 Lyka Ugarte as Doña Lisa Mondigo - Amalia's friend who owned the boat intended to bring the Cristi family to their hiding island.
 Miguel de Guzman as Buknoy - Tod's co-worker and friend
 Angel Sy as Bimpy - Daughter of the water theme park owner, healed by Agua.
 Kimberly Faye as Jocelyn
 Kristine Bartucio as Maldita Woman (Episode 1)

Komiks adaptation
Agua Bendita was a comic created by Rod Santiago in the 1980s. It was published by Liwayway Comics and adapted on television through the series, Komiks first aired in 2006 and again during Holy Week 2007, with two-part episodes in Season 1 starring Shaina Magdayao as Agua/Bendita and Rayver Cruz as Ronnie.

Launch
Agua Bendita was launched as one of the ABS-CBN's offerings for the 60th Celebration of Filipino Soap Opera ("Ika-60 taon ng Pinoy Soap Opera"), during the ABS-CBN Trade Launch for the first quarter of 2010, titled "Bagong Simula" (New Beginning).

Reruns
Agua Bendita was later re-aired on Jeepney TV after its initial broadcast.

Special Holy Week Rerun
In observance of the Lenten season, Agua Bendita had its encore telecast on Maundy Thursday (April 1, 2010), Good Friday (April 2, 2010), and on Black Saturday (April 3, 2010) at 8:00 pm to 10:00 pm as part of ABS-CBN's Holy Week presentation.

The 3-part marathon special had ratings of "35% on Maundy Thursday, 26.1% on Good Friday, and 25.7% on Black Saturday".

Theme song
The show uses "Malayo Pa Ang Umaga" as its theme song, originally composed and sung by Rey Valera. The first version is sung by Aria Clemente and the second version is sung by Vina Morales.

See also
2010 in Philippine television
Television in the Philippines
Catholic television
Catholic television channels
Catholic television networks
List of programs broadcast by ABS-CBN
List of programs aired by ABS-CBN

References

External links
 Andi Eigenmann Fan Site

ABS-CBN drama series
Television series by Dreamscape Entertainment Television
2010 Philippine television series debuts
2010 Philippine television series endings
Fantaserye and telefantasya
Television shows based on comics
Television series by Star Creatives
Filipino-language television shows
Television shows set in Quezon City
Television shows set in Cebu
Television shows about Catholicism